The Penchennerie is a stream in southwestern France. It is a tributary of the river Auvézère, which is part of the Dordogne basin.

The river begins in the commune of Coussac-Bonneval in the Haute-Vienne department, passes through the Corrèze department near Saint-Éloy-les-Tuileries, and flows into the Auvézère in the Dordogne department, northeast of Payzac.

References

Rivers of France
Rivers of Nouvelle-Aquitaine
Rivers of Dordogne